Francis Burton (1 December 1696 – 20 March 1744), from Buncraggy, County Clare, Ireland, was an Anglo-Irish politician and landowner. He was a Member of Parliament for Coleraine from 1721 until 1727 and sat subsequently in the Irish House of Commons for Clare from 1727 until his death in 1744.

Background
Burton was born in Buncraggy, the son of Francis Burton (1640–1714). The senior Francis Burton in 1698 was granted some territories in Dromelihy, County Clare (previously associated with the MacGorman family and the O'Brien Viscount Clare) in the aftermath of the Williamite War in Ireland and the overthrow of James II. The Burton family were of English origin; Francis' great-grandfather Thomas Burton (born 1590) was originally from Shropshire, England.

He married the sister of Henry Conyngham, 1st Earl Conyngham. and was the father of Francis, 2nd Baron Conyngham and  William Burton Conyngham. The contemporary Marquess Conyngham and Baron Londesborough families actually descend in the paternal line from Burton, despite using the surnames of Conyngham and Denison respectively.

References

1696 births
1744 deaths
Irish MPs 1715–1727
Irish MPs 1727–1760
Members of the Privy Council of Ireland
Francis
Members of the Parliament of Ireland (pre-1801) for County Londonderry constituencies
Members of the Parliament of Ireland (pre-1801) for County Clare constituencies